Planaphrodes is a genus of leafhoppers in the family Cicadellidae. There are about 14 described species in Planaphrodes.

Species
These 14 species belong to the genus Planaphrodes:

 Planaphrodes alboguttata Kato 1933 c g
 Planaphrodes angulaticeps (Emeljanov, 1964) g
 Planaphrodes araxicus Logvinenko 1971 c g
 Planaphrodes bella Choe 1981 c g
 Planaphrodes bifasciata Linnaeus, 1758 c g b
 Planaphrodes dobrogicus Cantoreanu 1968 c g
 Planaphrodes elongatus Lethierry 1876 c g
 Planaphrodes iranicus Dlabola 1971 c g
 Planaphrodes laeva (Rey, 1891) g
 Planaphrodes modicus Logvinenko 1966 c g
 Planaphrodes monticola (Logvinenko, 1965) g
 Planaphrodes nigritus Kirschbaum 1868 c g
 Planaphrodes trifasciata (Geoffroy, 1785) g
 Planaphrodes vallicola Logvinenko 1967 c g

Data sources: i = ITIS, c = Catalogue of Life, g = GBIF, b = Bugguide.net

References

Further reading

External links

 

Aphrodinae
Cicadellidae genera